This is a season-by-season list of records compiled by the Air Force Academy in men's ice hockey.

The Air Force has made seven appearances in the NCAA Tournament, all as a consequence of winning the Atlantic Hockey tournament. The Falcons have won three games, twice defeating the #1 team in the nation.

Season-by-season results

Note: GP = Games played, W = Wins, L = Losses, T = Ties

* Winning percentage is used when conference schedules are unbalanced.

Footnotes

References

 
Lists of college men's ice hockey seasons in the United States
Air Force Falcons ice hockey seasons